The 1964 USAC Championship Car season consisted of 13 races, beginning in Avondale, Arizona on March 22 and concluding at the same location on November 22. There was also one non-championship event at Pikes Peak, Colorado.  The USAC National Champion and Indianapolis 500 winner was A. J. Foyt. At Indianapolis in the 500 mile race Eddie Sachs and Dave MacDonald were killed during lap 2 of the race; Sachs was 37 years old, and MacDonald was 27. In the Tony Bettenhausen Memorial at Springfield, Bill Horstmeyer died during the race; he was 34 years old. In November, five days after the season ended, Bobby Marshman died in a testing accident at Phoenix; he was 28 years old.

Schedule and results

 No pole is awarded for the Pikes Peak Hill Climb, in this schedule on the pole is the driver who started first. No lap led was awarded for the Pikes Peak Hill Climb, however, a lap was awarded to the drivers that completed the climb.

Final points standings

References
 
 
 http://media.indycar.com/pdf/2011/IICS_2011_Historical_Record_Book_INT6.pdf  (p. 266-267)

See also
 1964 Indianapolis 500

USAC Championship Car season
USAC Championship Car
1964 in American motorsport